Dobležiče is a settlement in the Municipality of Kozje in eastern Slovenia. The area is part of the historical Styria region. The municipality is now included in the Savinja Statistical Region.

The local church is dedicated to the Holy Trinity and belongs to the Parish of Pilštanj. It has a Romanesque core with major 18th-century rebuilding phases.

References

External links
Dobležiče on Geopedia

Populated places in the Municipality of Kozje